Irish Spring is an American brand of deodorant soap that the Colgate-Palmolive company has marketed since 1970.

History 
Irish Spring was launched in Germany in 1970 and in the US in 1972. Up until 1990, Irish Spring soap bars only came in one scent (known internally as "Ulster Fragrance"), but the Colgate company has since branched out into several niche varieties and scents. Irish Spring deodorants and shaving products were manufactured until the 1980s. In 2007, Irish Spring body wash was introduced. In addition, in 2011, Irish Spring deodorant was reintroduced as part of Colgate-Palmolive's Speed Stick brand of products.

In 1986, the soap changed its formula, included a different scent, and added skin conditioners.

Variants 
Irish Spring currently has ten variants:
Original Clean
Moisture Blast
Active Scrub
5 in 1
Charcoal Refresh
Aloe Mist
Ultimate Wake Up
Black Mint
Sage & Cedar
Mountain Chill
Irish Spring also has 3 natural variants:
Relaxing Sandalwood & Hemp
Exfoliating Salt & White Birch
Hydrating Eucalyptus & Mint

Television advertisements 

Television advertisements for the product have usually been set in an Irish village or a forest. The product had one of the most famous slogans of the past few decades, uttered by a showering woman uttering the phrase, "Manly, yes, but I like it too", to describe its crossover appeal to both women and men.

Other oft-used slogans included: "Fresh and clean as a whistle" (in which a wolf whistle was heard after "fresh" and before "clean as a whistle"), "All the freshness of Ireland Bottled", "Clean a man up right", "The Irish Never Quit", and "Smell like you're worth exploring". Most currently, the tagline is: "Add a little Irish to your Game".

The television advertisements also featured people singing while bathing in the soap, sometimes in public and fully clothed, and a man carving off the side of the soap with a knife to reveal the soap's striped cross-section.

Irish Spring is also a sponsoring partner of The Onion, a satirical newspaper-styled website.

The 2009 campaign focused on Irish Spring Body Wash, with the tagline: "All the freshness of Ireland bottled". They have a website (GetIrishNow.com) where the user can learn how to be more charming, download ringtones, get a free T-shirt & body wash giveaways, and learn more about their products.

The 2015 advertising campaign supported the new Irish Spring body wash and bar soap, Signature for Men. The TV spots, which ran from January to March 2015, featured an Irish actor providing dialogue over scenes in which men typically get dirty. The campaign utilized the slogan: "Clean a Man Up Right".

In 2017, Jenna Marbles, a well-known YouTuber, advertised Irish Spring as the favorite soap of her dog, Kermit. In 2018, Marbles made a bed out of Irish Spring products for Kermit as a birthday present. The company sponsored neither video. Irish Spring took the opportunity to gain publicity in 2019, when they sent Kermit soap and some swag, including a beach towel with his face on it, as a birthday present. Jenna posted about the gift on her Snapchat story.

References

External links 

Soap brands
Colgate-Palmolive brands
Products introduced in 1970